Ernest Brazier Cozens (November 24, 1888 – June 8, 1929) was an American football player and college administrator.  He was one of the first "roving centers" in American football and was named an All-American in 1910.

Athlete
Born in Haddonfield, New Jersey, Cozens attended the Haverford School where he played football, baseball and cricket.  He enrolled at the University of Pennsylvania in 1907 and became one of the greatest athletes in the school's history.  He was selected as an All-American at the center in 1910, and also won All-Eastern honors in baseball.  Cozens was the starting center for Penn in 1909 and 1910 and was elected captain of the 1910 team.  Cozens was "one of the first of the roving centers."  In the 1910 game between Penn and the Haskell Indian School, Cozens intercepted a pass and returned it 80 yards for a touchdown.  He was also the catcher for the Penn baseball team.

Coach and administrator
After graduating from Penn, Cozens was a football coach at Carnegie Tech and a baseball coach at Shady Side Academy.

In 1922, Cozens was hired as the graduate manager of athletics at Penn.  In that capacity, he was one of the organizers of intercollegiate boxing and served as the President of the Eastern Intercollegiate Boxing Association.  He also helped organize and served as President of the Eastern Intercollegiate Baseball League.

Family and death
Cozens was married in 1919 to Amelia Schmertz.  They had four children, Ernest B. Cozens, Jr. (born c. 1917, Amelia Cozens (born c. 1920), William Cozens (born c. 1924) and Lee Cozens (born c. 1927).  He died suddenly of heart failure while sitting in his office at Penn.  He was age 40 when he died.

Head coaching record

College football

References

External links
 

1888 births
1929 deaths
American football centers
Carnegie Mellon Tartans football coaches
Penn Quakers football players
High school baseball coaches in the United States
All-American college football players
Haverford School alumni
People from Haddonfield, New Jersey